Wiethoff is a German surname.

Geographical distribution
As of 2014, 86.6% of all known bearers of the surname Wiethoff were residents of Germany (frequency 1:58,053), 10.2% of the United States (1:2,216,266) and 1.4% of the Netherlands (1:733,980).

In Germany, the frequency of the surname was higher than national average (1:58,053) only in one state: North Rhine-Westphalia (1:14,671)

People
 Rob Wiethoff (born 1976), American actor, famous for voicing John Marston from the Red Dead series of video games

References

German-language surnames
Surnames of German origin